Anthony Wheaton, professionally known by his stage name Sir Jinx, is an American hip hop producer and rapper from Los Angeles. He is a cousin of multi-platinum producer Dr. Dre. He began his career as a member of the C.I.A. in the mid-80s with Ice Cube and Kid Disaster. He produced tracks for the likes of Dazzie Dee, Westside Connection, Too Short, Yo-Yo, Tone Loc, Kool G Rap, CeCe Peniston, Xzibit and Kurupt among others, and also remixed songs for Rage Against the Machine, Public Enemy and Toni Braxton.

Career

1980s 
Anthony "Sir Jinx" Wheaton began his career in the mid-80s as a part of hip hop duo the Stereo Crew with fellow rapper Ice Cube. They were signed with Epic Records and released their debut single "She's a Skag" in 1986, which was produced by Wheaton's cousin Dr. Dre and Dre's World Class Wreckin' Cru bandmate Alonzo Williams. Poor single sales caused them to be soon dropped off of the label. Joined by fellow rapper Kid Disaster, they were picked by Kru-Cut Records and changed the group's name to C.I.A. In 1987 the trio released their single "My Posse" and appeared on the cover of N.W.A. and the Posse. Cube and Dre have been focused on forming N.W.A, which led to disband the C.I.A. Wheaton produced fellow rapper Dazzie Dee's first extended play Turn It Loose, released in 1989.

1990s 
When Cube left N.W.A and Ruthless Records over a financial dispute, all the former C.I.A. members along with several other artists formed the Lench Mob posse on Cube's founded Lench Mob Records label. Wheaton and Cube in collaboration with Chilly Chill and New York-based hip hop production team The Bomb Squad produced Ice Cube's debut solo studio album AmeriKKKa's Most Wanted and the follow-up Kill at Will EP, both released in 1990. Both these projects were certified Platinum by the Recording Industry Association of America. Same year Wheaton produced "Ain't Nothin' but a Word to Me", the only song from Too Short's Short Dog's in the House album that has a featured guest appearance (by Ice Cube).

In 1991, Wheaton produced a significant number of songs on Yo-Yo's Make Way for the Motherlode, WC and the Maad Circle's Ain't a Damn Thang Changed, and Ice Cube's Death Certificate, including NWA diss track "No Vaseline". He also produced "How to Survive in South Central", a Cube's song from Boyz n the Hood soundtrack, and Tone Lōc "I Adore You". Continuing into 1992 with Cube's The Predator and Yo-Yo's 1992 Black Pearl, Wheaton stepped onto East Coast hip hop scene producing the majority of Kool G Rap's final studio album with DJ Polo Live and Let Die, and also managed to provide additional production on two tracks for George Clinton's son Trey Lewd's Drop the Line, and to produce the title track for Music from the Motion Picture Trespass. Sir Jinx created remixes for rap-rock outfits such as Rage Against the Machine's "Guerrilla Radio (Sir Jinx Edit)", "Bullet in the Head (Sir Jinx Remix)", and the unreleased "Bombtrack (Remix)", all of which were recorded in 1992.

After producing a couple of tracks on Ice Cube's 1993 album Lethal Injection, Wheaton stopped working with Cube and his group Da Lench Mob due to their controversial direction. He moved on to producing for R&B-oriented solo acts such as CeCe Peniston, Gerald Levert, Isaac Hayes, Teena Marie, and former Bell Biv DeVoe member Ricky Bell.

Following a low-profile independent solo album in 1995, Sir Jinx returned to hip hop production on Gooch's 1997 album A Lot on It and Xzibit's 1998 album 40 Dayz & 40 Nightz. He also helped to produce skits on Tash's 1999 Rap Life and helped on Xzibit's 2000 Restless.

2000s 
Wheaton provided production work on a song from comedian Eddie Griffin's 2003 film Dysfunktional Family soundtrack. Same year he produced a couple of tracks on The Comrads member Gangsta album Penitentiary Chances, as well as a posse cut on Westside Connection's album Terrorist Threats.

Outside of some minor production on Kurupt's 2004 album Originals and 2005 album Against the Grain, Xzibit's 2004 album Weapons of Mass Destruction, and Ras Kass's 2009 project Quarterly, Sir Jinx was relatively low-key during this period.

2010s 
In 2010, Wheaton produced a song for Sadat X's Wild Cowboys II album, as well as the track "Life in California" from Ice Cube's I Am the West album, which marked the first time Sir Jinx and Cube had worked together on any new material together in several years. In an October 2010 interview for HipHopDX, Wheaton stated that he was going to help produce cousin Dr. Dre's long-awaited release Detox. In spite of his relation to Dr. Dre, this is the first album the two have worked on together.

Sir Jinx collaborated with Tri Star and Dat Boi Hop to form General Population. The group released their album Sir Jinx Presents General Population: Rime Scene in 2011 featuring guest appearances from Butch Cassidy, Roscoe, Devin the Dude, Jayo Felony, Kurupt, Ras Kass. The following year, Jinx produced the entire Tri Star's project Trilogy. Together with Mike & Keys, Jinx produced debut Serial Killers single "First 48". In 2016, he and Dre produced T.I.'s non-album single "Dope", which featured vocals by Marsha Ambrosius.

2020s 
Reports have surfaced that Sir Jinx is now suing Ice Cube for unpaid royalties.

Film and television
Sir Jinx has made appearances co-hosting BET's Rap City: Tha Basement.

He has also DJ'ed for various TV shows including Jimmy Kimmel Live! and "The Orlando Jones Show".

In 1993, Sir Jinx had a cameo in John Singleton's romantic drama film Poetic Justice.

Production discography

References

External links
 
 
DJ Sir Jinx Interview NAMM Oral History Library (2020)

Living people
West Coast hip hop musicians
21st-century American rappers
WC and the Maad Circle members
Record producers from California
African-American record producers
American hip hop record producers
21st-century American male musicians
21st-century African-American musicians
1970 births